Canterbury is a town in Windham County, Connecticut, United States. The population was 5,045 at the 2020 census.

History
The area was settled by English colonists in the 1680s as Peagscomsuck. It consisted mainly of land north of Norwich, south of New Roxbury, Massachusetts (now Woodstock, Connecticut), and west of the Quinebaug River, Peagscomsuck Island, and the Plainfield Settlement. In 1703 this section was officially separated from Plainfield and named The Town of Canterbury. The town's name is a transfer from Canterbury, England.

Prudence Crandall's School (1831–1834)

In 1832, Prudence Crandall, a schoolteacher raised as a Quaker, stirred controversy when she opened the Canterbury Female Boarding School and admitted black girls as students. Prominent Canterbury resident Andrew T. Judson led efforts against the school. The Connecticut General Assembly passed a "Black Law", which prohibited the education of black children from out of state. Crandall persisted in teaching, and in 1833 was arrested and kept in jail overnight.

Unsuccessful and long legal proceedings were mounted but violence by a mob of Canterbury residents forced the closure of the school in 1834. Crandall left the state and never returned. Connecticut repealed the Black Law in 1838.

In 1877 the town of Canterbury recognized Crandall, who had moved to Elk Falls, Kansas, with a small pension. Crandall, who by then was living in poverty, said that this helped improve her living condition. She died in 1881.

Legacy and honors
In 1995, the Connecticut General Assembly designated Prudence Crandall as the state's official heroine because she opened the first school in the United States for black girls. The school still stands in Canterbury. It is now operated as the Prudence Crandall Museum. It has been designated as a National Historic Landmark, and it is the leading tourist attraction in Canterbury.

In 2009 a life-size bronze statue of Prudence Crandall with an African-American student was installed in the state capital.

Geography

Demographics

As of the census of 2000, there were 4,692 people, 1,717 households, and 1,339 families residing in the town. The racial makeup of the town was 97.34% White, 0.36% African American, 0.28% Native American, 0.26% Asian, 0.02% Pacific Islander, 0.30% from other races, and 1.45% from two or more races. Hispanic or Latino of any race were 1.07% of the population.

There were 1,717 households, out of which 37.2% had children under the age of 18 living with them, 65.5% were married couples living together, 8.1% had a female householder with no husband present, and 22.0% were non-families. 16.7% of all households were made up of individuals, and 6.6% had someone living alone who was 65 years of age or older. The average household size was 2.73 and the average family size was 3.06.

In the town, the population was spread out, with 25.7% under the age of 18, 7.3% from 18 to 24, 31.4% from 25 to 44, 26.3% from 45 to 64, and 9.3% who were 65 years of age or older. The median age was 38 years. For every 100 females, there were 103.3 males. For every 100 females age 18 and over, there were 97.9 males.

The median income for a household in the town was $55,547, and the median income for a family was $65,095. Males had a median income of $41,521 versus $28,672 for females. The per capita income for the town was $22,317. About 3.5% of families and 4.5% of the population were below the poverty line, including 4.2% of those under age 18 and 10.0% of those age 65 or over.

Arts and culture

Museums and other points of interest

 Canterbury Center Historic District – Roughly along Elmdale, Library, N. Canterbury, S. Canterbury, and Westminster Rds. (added May 10, 1998). The historic district includes Colonial, Federal, and other architectural styles.
 Capt. John Clark House – Rte. 169, S of Canterbury (added November 6, 1970)
 Jonathan Wheeler House – N. Society Rd. (added March 11, 1982)
 March Route of Rochambeau's Army: Manship Road-Barstow Road – Manship Rd., Barstow Rd. from jct. with Manship Rd. to Westminster Rd. (added February 8, 2003)
 Prudence Crandall House – Jct. of CT 14 and 169 (added November 22, 1970)
 Westminster Congregational Church
 FaithWay Community Church – 567 S. Canterbury Rd. Canterbury, CT 06374

Government

Canterbury's new administration was elected in November 2019. They will serve through November 2021.   Christopher J. Lippke (R) is First Selectman, Mark O. Weeks (R) is Second Selectman, Jonathan T. Lane (D) is Third Selectman. Natalie Ruth Ellston was elected to serve as Town Clerk and Tax Collector of Canterbury CT. Laurie Epler is the hired Town Treasurer.

Education
Students from grades Kindergarten through 8 are zoned to the Canterbury School District. The district has two schools:
 Canterbury Elementary School
 Dr. Helen Baldwin Middle School

The local elementary school for kindergarten through fourth grades is Canterbury Elementary School, whose mascot is the Kitt Fox. The local middle school for fifth through eighth grades is Dr. Helen Baldwin Middle School, whose mascot is the bulldog.

As Canterbury has no high school of its own, Canterbury students have the option of attending H.H. Ellis Technical High School, Griswold High School, Killingly High School,  Norwich Technical High School, Norwich Free Academy, or Woodstock Academy.

Notable people

 John Adams, (1772–1863), born in Canterbury, noted educator and organizer of several hundred Sunday schools
 Horace Austin (1831–1905), the sixth governor of Minnesota (1870–1874), was born in town
 Margaret Wise Brown (1919–1952), author of children's literature
 Moses Cleaveland (1754–1806), a surveyor and namesake of Cleveland, Ohio, was born in town
 Prudence Crandall (1803–1890), a schoolteacher who set up a school for black girls in town despite local resistance
 Sarah Harris Fayerweather (1812–1878), first black student in Prudence Crandall's school
 Luther Jewett (1772–1860), United States Representative from Vermont, was born in town
 Ephraim Paine (1730–1785) delegate for New York to the Continental Congress in 1784, was born in town
 Charles Rocket, born Charles Adams Claverie (1949–2005), actor and former resident, who died in town
 Jeptha Root Simms (1807–1883) historian and geologist, born in Canterbury
 Loren P. Waldo (1802–1881), U.S. Representative
 Joseph Williamson, born in Canterbury and President of Maine Senate
 William Durkee Williamson (1779–1846) a governor of Maine (1821) was born in town

References

External links
 

Town government Web site
Connecticut Genealogy: Canterbury, Windham County, Connecticut History
ePodunk: Profile for Canterbury Connecticut

 
Towns in Windham County, Connecticut
Towns in Connecticut